Union Bank of India,  commonly referred to as Union Bank or UBI, is an central public sector bank under the ownership of Ministry of Finance, Government of India. It is headquartered in Mumbai. It has 120+ million customers and a total business of US$106 billion. After the merging with Corporation Bank and Andhra Bank, which came into effect on 1 April 2020, the merged entity became the one of the largest PSU banks in terms of branch network with around 8700+ branches. Four of these are located overseas in Hong Kong, Dubai, Antwerp, and Sydney. UBI also has representative offices at Shanghai, Beijing and Abu Dhabi. UBI operates in the United Kingdom through its wholly owned subsidiary, Union Bank of India (UK). The bank has a network of 8700+ domestic branches, 11100+ ATMs, 15300+ Business Correspondent Points serving over 120 million customers with 75000+ employees.

History

Union Bank of India was established on 11 November 1919 in Bombay (now Mumbai) by Seth Sitaram Poddar. The bank's corporate office was inaugurated by Mahatma Gandhi. At the time of India's independence in 1947, the bank had four branches – three in Mumbai and one in Saurashtra in trade centres. By the time the Indian government nationalized UBI in 1969, it had 240 branches. In 1975, it acquired Belgaum Bank, a private sector bank established in 1930 that had itself merged in a bank in 1964, the Shri Jadeya Shankarling Bank (Bijapur; incorporated on 10 May 1948). In 1985, it acquired Miraj State Bank, which had been established in 1929, and which had 26 branches. In 1999, UBI acquired Sikkim Bank with its eight branches.

UBI expanded internationally in 2007 with the opening of offices in Abu Dhabi, United Arab Emirates and in Shanghai, China. In 2008, it established a branch in Hong Kong. In 2009, Union Bank opened a representative office in Sydney, Australia.

On 30 August 2019, Finance Minister Nirmala Sitharaman announced that Andhra Bank and Corporation Bank would be merged into Union Bank of India. The Board of Directors of Andhra Bank approved the merger on 13 September. The Union Cabinet approved the merger on 4 March, and it was  completed on 1 April 2020.

Subsidiaries 
 Union Bank of India (UK) Limited
 Union Asset Management Co. Private Limited
 Union Trustee Co. Pvt. Limited
 Star Union Dai-ichi Life Insurance Co. Limited
 Chaitanya Godavari Grameen Bank
 Corpbank Securities ltd.
 UBI Services Ltd

See also

 Banking in India
 List of banks in India
 Reserve Bank of India
 Indian Financial System Code
 List of largest banks
 List of companies of India
 Make in India

References

External links 
 

Public Sector Banks in India
Banks based in Mumbai
Banks established in 1919
Companies nationalised by the Government of India
Indian brands
Indian companies established in 1919
Companies listed on the National Stock Exchange of India
Companies listed on the Bombay Stock Exchange